Mount Bolton is located on the border of Alberta and British Columbia on the Continental Divide, northeast of Elkford, Kootenay Land District. It was named after Bolton, Lambert Ernest Stanley DLS. Bolton was serving with the Canadian Pioneers, 1st Battilion when he was killed in action on June 13, 1916.

See also
List of peaks on the British Columbia–Alberta border

References

Two-thousanders of Alberta
Two-thousanders of British Columbia
Canadian Rockies
Kootenay Land District